La Giralda in the Santurce barrio of San Juan, Puerto Rico is a four-story reinforced concrete house that was built in c. 1910.  It was listed on the U.S. National Register of Historic Places in 2008.

It is located at 651 José Martí Street, at Miramar Avenue, at the highest point of the Miramar neighborhood, and is believed to have been designed by architect Francisco Valinés Cofresí and includes eclectic architectural style, including Neoclassical and Victorian elements, on an irregular square plan with a rounded balcony at its corner.  It is unusual for its complexity including a crossed gabled roof with pediments.  It is regarded as a "historic jewel", the finest of 21 buildings surviving in Miramar from the early 20th century.

References

Old San Juan, Puerto Rico
Houses on the National Register of Historic Places in Puerto Rico
National Register of Historic Places in San Juan, Puerto Rico
Neoclassical architecture in Puerto Rico
1910 establishments in Puerto Rico
Houses completed in 1910
Victorian architecture
Santurce, San Juan, Puerto Rico